Jameson Tavern is an historic building on Main Street in Freeport, Maine, United States. It was completed in 1779, as a home for local physician Dr. John Anglier Hyde, a decade before the town was incorporated and when it was part of North Yarmouth, then in Massachusetts. It stands across the side street Justin's Way from L.L.Bean's flagship store. 

It became an important meeting place during the discussions regarding the District of Maine's secession from Massachusetts in the early 19th century. It is believed representatives of the Joint Commission of Massachusetts and Maine met on the second floor of the building ("in its northeastern corner") in 1820 to sign the final papers giving Maine its independence, thus giving it the claim that it is the "birthplace of Maine." The Daughters of the American Revolution installed a plaque, describing these events, on the property in 1914.  The Freeport Historical Society, meanwhile, has said it has found no record that the commissioners ever met in town.

Poets Henry Wadsworth Longfellow and John Greenleaf Whittier, as well as United States president Franklin Pierce, are understood to have visited the tavern.

The property was built by Dr. John Anglier Hyde, a local physician. (Hyde's daughter, Mary, married Ebenezer Wells, professor of obstetrics at the Medical School of Maine.) Shortly after the home's completion, it was sold to Captain Samuel Jameson (1766–1814). It was run as a tavern between 1801 and 1828, when Jameson's widow sold it.

The tavern became Codman's Tavern, owned by Richard Codman, in 1828. He was the proprietor for 28 years, at which point it was purchased by John Cushing, a local shipbuilder.

Today, it is known as Jameson Tavern once again, and it is operated as such, albeit only in the building's rear wing; the main building is now a tourist-information office for visitors to the town. The tavern closed in 2013, but has since reopened. It was put on the market in 2019.

References 

Historic sites in Maine
Restaurants in Maine
Taverns in Maine
1779 establishments in Massachusetts
Commercial buildings completed in 1779
Buildings and structures in Freeport, Maine